Benqué is a former commune in the Hautes-Pyrénées department in southwestern France. On 1 January 2017, it was merged into the new commune Benqué-Molère.

Population

See also
Communes of the Hautes-Pyrénées department

References

Former communes of Hautes-Pyrénées